The Coroner's Gambit is the fifth studio album by the Mountain Goats, released on October 17, 2000 by Absolutely Kosher Records.
Several songs from this album, including The Coroner's Gambit, Bluejays and Cardinals, and Shadow Song, were written about Rozz Williams, who ended his life two years before the release of the album, and was a personal friend of John Darnielle. In some live versions, he will reference Williams by first name.

Recording
The album is mostly John Darnielle and his acoustic guitar, but it has sparse auxiliary instrumentation as well. Most of the songs were recorded on John's Panasonic RX-FT500 boom box, but due to either mechanical failure or desire for clearer sound quality, he used a 4-track recording machine for some tracks.

Track listing

Personnel
John Darnielle - vocals, guitar, production

References

External links
Complete lyrics to the album
Coroner's Gambit Information Page from themountaingoats.net

2000 albums
The Mountain Goats albums